Julia Ashley (born November 11, 1996) is an American soccer player who plays as a defender for Houston Dash of the National Women's Soccer League (NWSL). She previously played for Adelaide United and Linköpings FC, as well as collegiately for the North Carolina Tar Heels.

Early life

University of North Carolina
In Ashley's freshman season she started all 21 games at right back and was named to the 2015 Freshman All-ACC Team. In her sophomore year, she played in 24 games and ranked second on the team in minutes played. In her junior year, Ashley was one of the nation's most consistent defensive performers, she started all 22 games at right back and was second-team All-ACC and was named to the 2017 All-ACC Academic Women's Soccer Team. In her senior season, Ashley started all 25 games for the Tar Heels as they advanced all the way to the College Cup Final, where they were defeated 1–0 by Florida State.

Club career

Linköpings
On January 20, 2019, Ashley signed a five-month contract with Linköpings FC in the Damallsvenskan in Sweden. She made her professional debut on February 16, starting in a Svenska Cupen game against Växjö. She made her league debut against the same opposition on April 17. On May 22, 2019, she was released by the team having struggled for playing time with injury and competition within the squad.

Adelaide United
In November 2019, Ashley signed a deal with Australian club Adelaide United. She made her debut for the team on November 14, starting in the 2019–20 season opener against Western Sydney Wanderers.

OL Reign
Ashley was originally selected by Sky Blue FC with the 6th overall pick in the 2019 NWSL College Draft, but she never signed for the club. She expressed a hope that Sky Blue would either trade her NWSL rights to another team or release her. On January 17, 2020, Sky Blue traded her NWSL rights to Reign FC. Ashley subsequently signed a three-year contract with Reign FC on March 4, 2020.

Racing Louisville
On November 12, 2020, Ashley was chosen by Racing Louisville FC in the 2020 NWSL Expansion Draft.

Houston Dash
She was traded to Houston Dash in December 2021.

International career
Ashley was part of the United States U–20 player pool and was called up to a U–20 camp in January 2016. In 2018 she was named to the United States U–23 roster for the 2018 Thorns Spring Invitational. She received another U–23 call-up in March 2019 for the La Manga Tournament in Spain.

Career statistics

Club 
.

References

External links
UNC biography

1996 births
Living people
American women's soccer players
North Carolina Tar Heels women's soccer players
United States women's under-20 international soccer players
People from Verona, New Jersey
Soccer players from New Jersey
Sportspeople from Essex County, New Jersey
Women's association football defenders
NJ/NY Gotham FC draft picks
Linköpings FC players
Adelaide United FC (A-League Women) players
American expatriate sportspeople in Sweden
Damallsvenskan players
American expatriate women's soccer players
Expatriate women's footballers in Sweden
Expatriate women's soccer players in Australia
American expatriate sportspeople in Australia
Racing Louisville FC players
National Women's Soccer League players
Houston Dash players